Andrew Charlton (born 1979) is an Australian economist and politician.

Andrew Charlton may also refer to:

 Andrew Charlton (priest) (c. 1600s), Irish Anglican priest
 Boy Charlton (Andrew Murray Charlton, 1907–1975), Australian freestyle swimmer

See also
 Andrew Carlton (born 1977), American singer, songwriter and music producer
 Andrew Carleton (born 2000), American professional soccer player